The 2021 Leinster Senior Hurling Championship Final, the deciding game of the 2021 Leinster Senior Hurling Championship, was a hurling match that was played on 17 July 2021 at Croke Park, Dublin. It was contested by Kilkenny and Dublin.

Kilkenny, captained by Adrian Mullen, won the game by 1-25 to 0-19. The Dublin team had some withdrawals due to some players being close contacts of a confirmed Covid case. The match was tight in the 1st half but Kilkenny scored the last 3 points of the half to lead 0-12 to 0-9 at half time. Kilkenny stayed in front in the 2nd half and received a penalty in the 61st minute when Alan Murphy was fouled. Jake Malone was sin binned. TJ Reid scored a goal from the penalty and this score proved decisive.

Details

References

Leinster Senior Hurling Championship Finals
Dublin GAA matches
Kilkenny GAA matches